Taksimo Airport is an airport in Russia located 3 km northeast of Taksimo.  It is a paved airport with a parking apron.  It has civilian use.

Airlines and destinations

References

RussianAirFields.com

Airports built in the Soviet Union
Airports in Buryatia